Abadchi-ye Sofla (also Romanized as Ābādchī-ye Soflá; also known as Ābādchī-ye Pā’īn) is a village in Kabutarsorkh Rural District, in the Central District of Chadegan County, Isfahan Province, Iran. At the 2006 census, its population was 48, in 11 families.

References 

Populated places in Chadegan County